Habibul Islam Bhuiyan Bangladeshi lawyer and politician who was the Minister of Law, Justice and Parliamentary Affairs of Bangladesh.

Early life 
Habibul Islam Bhuiyan was born in Kishoreganj. He passed BA in 1964 and MA in 1966 from Dhaka University. He passed LLB in 1968 from the same university.

Career 
Habibul Islam Bhuiyan Habibul Islam Bhuiyan started his career as a lawyer in 1965. He enrolled as a lawyer in the East Pakistan High Court in 1970 and as a lawyer in the Supreme Court of Pakistan in 1973. He is also registered as a senior lawyer in the Appellate Division of the Supreme Court of Bangladesh. He was appointed a judge of the High Court Division in 1988.

In Ershad's cabinet from 2 May 1990 to 6 December 1990, he served as the Minister of Law, Justice and Parliamentary Affairs of Bangladesh. He was elected President of the Supreme Court Bar Association in 1998.

References 

Living people
Year of birth missing (living people)
People from Kishoreganj District
Bangladesh Nationalist Party politicians
20th-century Bangladeshi judges
20th-century Pakistani lawyers
Law, Justice and Parliamentary Affairs ministers of Bangladesh
University of Dhaka alumni